The 1961 Richmond Spiders football team was an American football team that represented the University of Richmond as a member of the Southern Conference (SoCon) during the 1961 NCAA University Division football season. In their eleventh season under head coach Ed Merrick, Richmond compiled a 5–5 record.

Schedule

References

Richmond
Richmond Spiders football seasons
Richmond Spiders football